Ethan Lewis is a labor economist and Associate Professor of Economics at Dartmouth College. His fields of specialization are labor economics and econometrics with a specific interest in how U.S. labor markets have adapted to immigration and technological change.

Prior to Dartmouth, Lewis was a visiting scholar at the Federal Reserve Bank of San Francisco and an economist in the Research Department of the Federal Reserve Bank of Philadelphia.

Education 
Lewis earned his Ph.D. in Economics from UC Berkeley in 2003. He graduated magna cum laude and Phi Beta Kappa with a B.A. in Economics from Williams College in 1995.

Research 
Lewis' research has been mentioned in the press numerous times by outlets such as The New York Times , The Wall Street Journal,  The Economist, NPR, and C-SPAN.

In recent work, he has studied how immigration waves advanced the Second Industrial Revolution and a study of how manufacturing firms adapt production technology to employ less-skilled immigrants. He has also studied how native-born families react to increasing enrollments of immigrant children in public schools.

Selected works
 Ethan Lewis. "Immigration, skill mix, and capital skill complementarity." The Quarterly Journal of Economics 126 (2), 1029-1069
 P Beaudry, M Doms, E Lewis. "Should the personal computer be considered a technological revolution? Evidence from US metropolitan areas." Journal of Political Economy 118 (5), 988-1036
 E Cascio, N Gordon, E Lewis, S Reber. "Paying for progress: Conditional grants and the desegregation of southern schools." The Quarterly Journal of Economics 125 (1), 445-482
 P Beaudry, E Lewis. "Do male-female wage differentials reflect differences in the return to skill? Cross-city evidence from 1980-2000." American Economic Journal: Applied Economics 6 (2), 178-94

Professional activities 
Lewis is a research associate of the National Bureau of Economic Research and the Center for Research and Analysis of Migration.  He serves on the Board of Editors for the American Economic Journal: Applied Economics and the journal for Regional Science and Urban Economics.

Personal 
Ethan Lewis is married to Elizabeth Cascio, Associate Professor of Economics at Dartmouth. They live in Hanover, New Hampshire with their two children.

References 

Year of birth missing (living people)
Living people
Labor economists
University of California, Berkeley alumni
Williams College alumni